The following is a list of episodes of the American anthology streaming television series Creepshow. The series premiered on Shudder in 2019 and features seventeen episodes with two horror stories per episode.

Overview

Episodes

Season 1 (2019)

Specials (2020)

Season 2 (2021)

Season 3 (2021)

References

External links
 
 

Lists of American horror television series episodes
Lists of American drama television series episodes